Cyclophora aguzata is a moth in the  family Geometridae. It is found in Ecuador.

References

Moths described in 1893
Cyclophora (moth)
Moths of South America